Saint-Mathias-sur-Richelieu is a municipality in the Canadian province of Quebec. It is located within the Rouville Regional County Municipality in the Montérégie region on the Richelieu River. The population as of the Canada 2011 Census was 4,618.

Demographics

Population
Population trend:

Language
Mother tongue language (2006)

Notable residents
Michel Jean - Anchorman and journalist TVA Nouvelles and Le Canale Nouvelles (LCN) a Quebec-based news network

See also
List of municipalities in Quebec

References

External links

Municipalité de Saint-Mathias-sur-Richelieu

Incorporated places in Rouville Regional County Municipality
Municipalities in Quebec
Greater Montreal